Agricultural Museum may refer to:
 Agricultural museum, the institution where agricultural artifacts are displayed.

It may also refer to: 
 Agricultural Museum (periodical), an American agricultural magazine
 Adatepe Olive Oil Museum, Turkey
 Agricultural Museum, Egypt
 Agricultural Museum (Malaysia)
 Canada Agriculture Museum
 Florida Agricultural Museum, USA
 Irish Agricultural Museum
 Manitoba Agricultural Museum, Canada
 New Jersey Museum of Agriculture, USA
 Tennessee Agricultural Museum, USA